Berlin, Ohio may refer to:
 Berlin, Holmes County, Ohio
 Berlin, Williams County, Ohio
 Berlin Center, Ohio
 Berlin Crossroads, Ohio
 Berlin Heights, Ohio

See also
Berlin Township, Ohio (disambiguation)